Edolo is a railway station in Edolo, Italy. The station opened on 4 July 1909 and is located on the Brescia-Iseo-Edolo railway. The train services are operated by Trenord.

Train services
The station is served by the following service(s):

Regional services (Treno regionale) Edolo - Iseo - Brescia

References

This article is based upon a translation of the Italian language version as at February 2015.

Railway stations in Lombardy
Buildings and structures in the Province of Brescia